Mount Spann is a mountain in Antarctica, 925 m, marking the north extremity of the Panzarini Hills and the Argentina Range, at the northeast end of the Pensacola Mountains. It was discovered and photographed on January 13, 1956, in the course of a U.S. Navy transcontinental nonstop plan flight from McMurdo Sound to Weddell Sea and return. 

It was named by the Advisory Committee on Antarctic Names (US-ACAN) for Staff Sgt. Robert C. Spann of the United States Marine Corps (USMC), the navigator of the P2V-2N Neptune aircraft during this flight.

References

 
Mountain ranges of Antarctica
Mountain ranges of Queen Elizabeth Land
Pensacola Mountains